North Turner is an unincorporated village in the town of Turner, Androscoggin County, Maine, United States. North Turner has a post office with ZIP code 04266.

References

Villages in Androscoggin County, Maine
Villages in Maine